Crystal Marie Reed (born February 6, 1985) is an American actress. She came to prominence for playing Allison Argent in the series Teen Wolf (2011–2014). She departed the series after the third season but made a guest appearance in the fifth season as Allison's ancestor Marie-Jeanne Valet. Reed went on to reprise her role as Allison Argent in the reunion film Teen Wolf: The Movie (2023). 

Reed played Sofia Falcone in the fourth season of Gotham (2017–2018) and the lead role of Abby Arcane in the series Swamp Thing (2019). She has also appeared in the films, Skyline (2010), Crush (2013), Too Late (2015) and Ghostland (2018).

Early life and education
Reed was born and raised in Detroit, to Polish and Native American parents. She has one older brother named Corey. Reed was raised in a conservative Catholic family, though she has also stated that she attended a Baptist church growing up and did not enjoy it. "I absolutely hated it and I knew that I would never fit in," Reed said.

She graduated from Roseville High School in 2003. Reed studied dance from an early age and was a dance captain in high school. She was an active member of her local community theatre and starred in the musicals Annie, Fiddler on the Roof and Grease.  She attended Wayne State University and was a part of the Bachelor of Fine Arts program, but left the program when she questioned whether it was the right fit for her. "I auditioned for the prestigious BFA conservatory program," she said. "They were very strict about the methods of acting, very particular about how we do things and I started questioning whether or not it was the right place for me, and whether or not [one] truly needed a degree to be an artist." She moved to Chicago and appeared in a number of local productions. In December 2008, she moved to Hollywood to pursue a screen career.

Career
In 2010, she guest starred in CSI: Crime Scene Investigation, CSI: NY, Rizzoli & Isles and The Hard Times of RJ Berger.

She played Allison Argent in the MTV series Teen Wolf. Before the third season of the series, Reed wanted to move on from the show, do different things and explore other areas of film creatively. She approached executive producer of the show, Jeff Davis, who supported her decision. Reed left the show in March 2014 in the form of Allison Argent's death at the end of the third season. Reed also stated that her desire to leave the show had to do with the difference in age to her character. Reed was 29-years old playing a 17-year old by the end of season three. She appeared in the February 23, 2016, episode, "The Maid of Gévaudan" as the first Argent werewolf hunter Marie-Jeanne Valet. While promoting Gotham, Reed said that she would love to be a part of a reboot or spin-off of Teen Wolf.

Reed's film credits include Skyline and Crazy, Stupid, Love.<ref name="CastBio">[http://www.muchmusic.com/tv/teenwolf/crystal.aspx Teen Wolf Cast Bios - Crystal Reed] - MuchMusic</ref> She starred in the horror film Ghostland, written and directed by French filmmaker Pascal Laugier. The film was first released in France on March 14, 2018.

On July 22, 2017, Reed was cast in the fourth season of the Fox television series Gotham as Sofia Falcone, the daughter of Carmine Falcone. The fourth season of Gotham premiered on September 21, 2017. Reed's portrayal of Falcone is the first time the comic-book character has been in a television show or movie.

On September 6, 2018, it was reported that Reed had been cast in the lead of the DC Universe television series Swamp Thing. She portrayed Abby Arcane, a smart and caring CDC Doctor who returns to her hometown in Louisiana and investigates what seems to be a deadly swamp-born virus but soon discovers that the swamp hold mystical and terrifying secrets. Swamp Thing premiered on May 31, 2019.

In September 2021, it was announced that a reunion film for Teen Wolf had been ordered by Paramount+, with Jeff Davis returning as a screenwriter and executive producer of the film. The majority of the original cast members, including Reed, were set to reprise their roles. The film was released on January 26, 2023.

Personal life
She was in a relationship with her Teen Wolf'' co-star Daniel Sharman from February 2012 to June 2013. In July 2013, Reed started dating television presenter Darren McMullen. McMullen and Reed broke up in early 2019.

Reed has said she moved out of her hometown because it "was completely small-minded and not accepting of things that I'm accepting of." Reed campaigned for Hillary Clinton leading up to the 2016 United States presidential election.

Reed lists golf as one of her hobbies when she is not acting.

Filmography

Film

Television

Awards and nominations

References

External links

 
 

1985 births
Living people
21st-century American actresses
Actresses from Detroit
American film actresses
American people of Polish descent
American people who self-identify as being of Native American descent
American television actresses
People from Roseville, Michigan
Wayne State University alumni